Jacques Aumont (born 25 February 1942) is a French academic and writer on film theory.

Born in Avignon he initially trained as an engineer but started contributing film criticism to Cahiers du cinéma in the late 1960s. He is professor emeritus at University of Paris III: Sorbonne Nouvelle, director of studies at the School for Advanced Studies in the Social Sciences, and professor at the École nationale supérieure des Beaux-Arts.

Works
 Montage Eisenstein, thesis, Paris: Paris 1, 1978. 
Translated by Lee Hildreth, Constance Penley, and Andrew Ross as Montage Eisenstein, Bloomington: Indiana University Press, 1985.
 (with A. Bergala, M. Marie and M. Vernet) Esthétique du film, Paris: Nathan, 1983. 
Translated and revised by Richard Neupert as Aesthetics of film, Austin: University of Texas Press, 1992.
 (with Michel Marie) L'analyse des films, Paris: Nathan, 1988.
  L'oeil interminable: cinéma et peinture, 1989.
 L'image, Paris: Nathan, 1990.
 Translated as The Image, London: BFI, 1993.
 Du visage au cinéma, 1992.
 Introduction à la couleur: des discours aux images, 1994.
 A quoi pensent les films, 1996.
 De l'esthétique au présent, 1998.
 Amnésies: fictions du cinéma d'après Jean-Luc Godard, 1999.
 (with Michel Marie) Dictionnaire théorique et critique du cinéma, Paris: Nathan, 2001.
 Les théories des cinéastes, Paris: Nathan, 2002.
 Limites de la fiction, Paris: Bayard, 2014.

References

1942 births
Living people
Film theorists
French film critics
French male writers
Academic staff of Sorbonne Nouvelle University Paris 3
Writers from Avignon